The 2021 Dallas Fuel season was the Dallas Fuel fourth season in the Overwatch League and the team's first under head coach Yun "RUSH" Hee-won. The team qualified for three of the four midseason tournaments throughout the regular season and won the franchise's first Overwatch League title after defeating the Shanghai Dragons in the May Melee finals. Finishing the regular season atop the West region, the Fuel reached the season playoffs for the first time in the franchise's history; however, they were defeated by the Atlanta Reign in the lower bracket finals. Head coach Yun "RUSH" Hee-won won the league's Coach of the Year award, damage player Kim "Sp9rk1e" Yeong-han was awarded the league's Dennis Hawelka Award, and four players were awarded Role Star commendations, tied for the most players in the league.

Preceding offseason

Organizational changes 
In October 2020, the Fuel signed former Overwatch Contenders team Element Mystic head coach Yun "RUSH" Hee-won as the Fuel's new head coach. The following week, they signed Go "Aid" Jae-yoon as an assistant coach and confirmed that 2020 interim head coach Kim "Yong" Yong-jin would remain with the team as an assistant coach.

Roster changes 

The Fuel entered the free agency with nine free agents, all of which became free agents due to the Fuel not exercising the option to retain the player for another year.

Acquisitions 
The Fuel's first offseason acquisition were Kim "SP9RK1E" Young-han and Choi "Hanbin" Han-been, damage players who were both acquired from the Paris Eternal on October 23, 2020. Four days later, the Fuel addressed their support line with the signings of Kwon "Fielder" Joon, a "big impact" support player for the Paris Eternal in 2020, and Kim "Rapel" Jung-keun, a "serviceable backup and second option" support player who played for the Houston Outlaws in 2020. The Fuel acquired several players in November; on November 7, 2020, they acquired Lee "Fearless" Eui-seok, a tank player who was "considered arguably the best main tank player in the world" with the Shanghai Dragons the previous season. The Fuel added another support player three days later with the signing of Lee "Jecse" Seung-soo, a third-year support player who also played for the Outlaws in 2020. On November 14, 2020, Dallas acquired Jung "Xzi" Ki-hyo, a damage player and hitscan specialist who was an Overwatch League MVP finalist in 2020, from the Paris Eternal.

Departures 
None of the Fuel's nine free agents returned, four of which signing with other teams, beginning with support player Jung "Closer" Won-sik signing with the Washington Justice on November 20, 2020. Four days later, support player William "Crimzo" Hernandez signed with the Houston Outlaws. On December 9, 2020, the Fuel lost damage player Stefan "Onigod" Fiskerstrand, who signed with Paris Eternal, and support player Nolan "Paintbrush" Edwards, who signed with Overwatch Contenders team Revival. Four of the Fuel's free agents retired: damage player Dylan "AKM" Bignet, tank player Noh "Gamsu" Young-jin, tank player Ashley "Trill" Powell, and support player Benjamin "Unkoe" Chevasson. Dallas' final free agent, tank player Lucas "Note" Meissner did not sign with a team in the offseason. Outside of their free agents, the Fuel parted ways with damage player Jung "Xzi" Ki-hyo on April 13, 2021, leaving the Fuel without a dedicated hitscan player; Jung had signed with the earlier in the offseason but retired from professional Overwatch due health issues.

Regular season 
The Fuel began their 2021 season on April 16, playing against in-state rival Houston Outlaws in the May Melee qualifiers. After trading wins throughout the first four maps, the Fuel lost the match after losing map five. The Fuel finished the qualifiers with a 2–2 win–loss record and qualified for the regional knockout round as the Western region's sixth, and final, seed. Dallas defeated the San Francisco Shock and the Houston Outlaws in the knockouts to advance to the interregional tournament bracket. Entering as the Western region's second seed, Dallas faced the Eastern region's top-seeded Chengdu Hunters on May 6 in the first round of the double-elimination tournament. Still without a dedicated hitscan player after Jung "Xzi" Ki-hyo departed late in the offseason, Dallas ran an "off-brand rush meta that finishes fights quickly," and after the Hunters won the third map of the series, which ended the Fuel's 11-map winning streak, Dallas won a "scrappy" fourth map to advance to the upper bracket finals. The Fuel took on the Shanghai Dragons in the upper finals on May 7. After five maps, the series was tied 2–2; a series-ending pulse-bomb from Kim "Sp9rk1e" Yeong-han playing as Tracer gave the Fuel the win and advanced the team to their first-ever Overwatch League final. After the Dragons made their way through the lower bracket of the tournament, the two teams again faced each other in the May Melee Grand Finals. After a back-and-forth series, the Fuel were ahead 3–2 going into the sixth map. In map six, Dallas' Kim "Sp9rk1e" Yeong-han effectively played as Soldier: 76, giving tank player Lee "Fearless" Eui-seok "infinite space … to cause chaos;" the Fuel won the series 4–2, giving the franchise their first Overwatch League title.

Prior to the beginning of following tournament cycle, the June Joust, the Fuel signed hitscan specialist Kim "Pine" Do-hyeon. Dallas won three of their four qualifying matches — the one loss being to the Shock, which snapped the Fuel's seven-game winning streak in the process. In the regional knockouts, the Fuel defeated the Los Angeles Gladiators and Houston Outlaws to advance to their second consecutive midseason tournament. In the first round of the tournament, the Fuel defeated the Dragons in a 3–0 sweep. The win advanced them to the upper bracket finals, where the Fuel took down the Atlanta Reign, 3–1, behind strong performances by their damage players Kim "Doha" Dong-ha and Kim "Sp9rk1e" Yeong-han. After the Dragons advanced through the lower bracket, the Fuel once again faced the Dragons in the tournament finals. Midway through the match, the Fuel found themselves up 3–1 in the first-to-four series. However, Dallas lost the following three maps, losing the match 3–4.

The Fuel went undefeated in their four qualifying matches of the Summer Showdown, the third tournament cycle of the regular season. In the qualifiers, the Fuel hosted the team's first live event since February 2020 at Esports Stadium Arlington. In the regional knockouts, Dallas received a bye in the first round, advancing them directly to the regional finals, where they defeated the Washington Justice. In their third consecutive tournament appearance, Dallas faced the Chengdu Hunters in the first round. The Fuel took an early lead, winning the first map of the series, but lost the following three to lose the match 1–3, dropping them to the lower bracket of the tournament. After defeating the Reign in the first round of the lower bracket, Dallas was handed its worse loss of the season in a 0–3 loss to the Hunters in the lower bracket finals.

In the final tournament cycle of the regular season, the Countdown Cup, the Fuel went 2–2 in the qualifiers, and in the regional knockouts, they fell to the Shock, marking the first time in the season they did not qualify for a midseason tournament. In regards to the team's poor performance in the tournament cycle, Fuel head coach Yun "RUSH" Hee-won stated that he had "lessened the amount of practice" the players were having due to the amount of work and travel the players had been experiencing throughout the season.

The team finished the regular season at the top of the standings in the West region with 11 wins, 5 losses, 17 league points. The finish gave them the second seed in the season playoffs, behind the top-seeded Shanghai Dragons. Head coach Yun "RUSH" Hee-won was named the league's coach of the year and damage player Kim "SP9RK1E" Yeong-han received the Dennis Hawelka award. Additionally, Kim "SP9RK1E" Young-han, Lee "Fearless" Eui-seok, Choi "Hanbin" Han-been, and Joon "Fielder" Kwon awarded Role Star commendations. With four players, the Fuel were tied with the Dragons for the most players receiving the award.

Playoffs 

Dallas selected the eighth-seeded Washington Justice as their opponent for the first round of the season playoffs. Dallas won the match, 3–1, advancing to the second round of the upper bracket. The team next swept the third-seeded Chengdu Hunters, 3–0, advancing them to the upper bracket finals. Moving on to the upper bracket finals, the Fuel faced the top-seeded Shanghai Dragons, marking the fifth time the two teams had played each other in a midseason or season playoff match in the 2021 season. Despite keeping the maps close, the Fuel lost the match, 1–3, sending them to the lower bracket. Sent to the lower bracket finals, the Fuel next faced the fifth-seeded Atlanta Reign. The two teams were tied 1–1 after two maps, but the Fuel lost the following two maps, losing the match 1–3 and ending their playoff run.

Final roster

Transactions 
Transactions of/for players on the roster during the 2021 regular season:
On May 10, the Fuel signed damage player Kim "Pine" Do-hyeon.

Standings

Game log

Regular season 

|2021 season schedule

Postseason

References 

Dallas Fuel
Dallas Fuel
Dallas Fuel seasons